Charleston National Forest was established as the Charleston Forest Reserve in Nevada by the U.S. Forest Service on November 5, 1906 with . It became a National Forest on March 4, 1907. On July 1, 1908 it was absorbed by Moapa National Forest and the name was discontinued. The lands exist presently as part of Toiyabe National Forest, and portions comprise Spring Mountains National Recreation Area.

References

External links
Forest History Society
Listing of the National Forests of the United States and Their Dates (from Forest History Society website) Text from Davis, Richard C., ed. Encyclopedia of American Forest and Conservation History. New York: Macmillan Publishing Company for the Forest History Society, 1983. Vol. II, pp. 743-788.

Former National Forests of Nevada
1907 establishments in Nevada
Protected areas established in 1907
Humboldt–Toiyabe National Forest
1908 disestablishments in Nevada
Protected areas disestablished in 1908